The Counterparts Tour was a concert tour by Canadian rock band Rush in support of their fifteenth studio album, Counterparts and the members' 20th anniversary as a band.

Background
The tour kicked off January 22, 1994 at the Civic Center in Pensacola, Florida and culminated on May 7, 1994 at Maple Leaf Gardens in Toronto, estimated to have performed to 589,137 fans. Opening acts for this tour were Candlebox, The Melvins, Primus, The Doughboys, and I Mother Earth. Some recordings from the tour were featured on the 1998 live album Different Stages.

Reception
The New York Timess John Pareles, reviewing one of the two Madison Square Garden shows in March, opened that the band performed for two hours amid film clips and special effects such as smoke, psychedelic patterned lights, and spark showers. He continued, stating that Rush flaunted music proficiency with "speeding guitar scales, hard-hitting drumming and earnest vocals" to "melodic hooks of pop tunes" similar to The Police. Noting on the audience, Pareles acknowledged that the band counted on many fans during the show to sing along to every song performed. The only criticism Pareles gave was the change in sound in songs when Lifeson went from acoustic to electric, proceeding the music at one "unvarying" volume, also noting that Rush lacked a rudimentary sense of dynamics.

Reviewing the May 3, 1994 performance at Albany's Knickerbocker Arena, Michael Hochanadel from The Sunday Gazette, praised the band's sound, stating that it sounded like it had settled into a sound similar to Pink Floyd and The Police and had become a genre themselves "through sheer sound and style", adding that the special effects and fireworks have elevated the band's music. Commenting on the interaction with Rush and their fans, Hochanadel noted when Lee had advanced closer towards the audience during the song "Closer to the Heart", stating that he matched movement to words as well as adding that Peart's drum solo had a tip-off when his drum riser was used.

Despite the positive reception from many critics and audiences, Ed Masley from the Pittsburgh Post-Gazette who attended the April 20, 1994 performance in Pittsburgh, had opened that Rush did not know how to put on a 'real' rock show, stating that Peart did not know anything about that - calling him a "drag". He noted on the special effects the band used in their performance, stating that the band were still boring, noting on how the images on the screen behind the band had drawn more applause than the musicians performing.

Kelley Crowley from the Observer-Reporter, whom also criticized the band's performance in a negative light claimed that Geddy Lee's vocals were possessed by the spirit of a mouse and in an "electronic frenzy", also criticizing the "muddy and distorted" sound the band had presented, and the mistakes Lifeson was making on his guitar solo in "The Spirit of Radio". Crowley also acknowledged the complaints of fans on their expectations of hearing the old material at the show. However though, Crowley stated that with the use of the video screen, special effects and lights, it was described as a "sensory experience".

Set list
This is an example setlist adapted from Rush: Wandering the Face of the Earth – The Official Touring History of what were performed during the tour, but may not represent the majority of the shows.

"Dreamline"
"The Spirit of Radio"
"The Analog Kid"
"Cold Fire"
"Time Stand Still"
"Nobody's Hero"
"Roll the Bones"
"Animate"
"Stick It Out"
"Double Agent"
"Limelight"
"Bravado"
"Mystic Rhythms"
"Closer to the Heart"
"Show Don't Tell"
"Leave That Thing Alone"
"The Rhythm Method" (drum solo)
"The Trees"
"Xanadu"
"Cygnus X-1 Book II: Hemispheres – Prelude"
"Tom Sawyer"
Encore
"Force Ten"
"YYZ"
"Cygnus X-1 Book I: The Voyage" (teaser)

Tour dates

Box office score data

Personnel
 Geddy Lee – vocals, bass, keyboards
 Alex Lifeson – guitar, backing vocals
 Neil Peart – drums

References

Citations

Sources
 
 

Rush (band) concert tours
1994 concert tours
Concert tours of North America
Concert tours of the United States
Concert tours of Canada